Crepidorhopalon is a genus of flowering plants belonging to the family Linderniaceae.

Its native range is Tropical and Southern Africa, Madagascar.

Species:

Crepidorhopalon affinis 
Crepidorhopalon alatocalycinus 
Crepidorhopalon bifolius 
Crepidorhopalon chironioides 
Crepidorhopalon debilis 
Crepidorhopalon flavus 
Crepidorhopalon goetzei 
Crepidorhopalon gracilis 
Crepidorhopalon hartlii 
Crepidorhopalon hepperi 
Crepidorhopalon involucratus 
Crepidorhopalon kwaleensis 
Crepidorhopalon latibracteatus 
Crepidorhopalon laxiflorus 
Crepidorhopalon malaissei 
Crepidorhopalon manganicola 
Crepidorhopalon membranocalycinus 
Crepidorhopalon microcarpaeoides 
Crepidorhopalon mutinondoensis 
Crepidorhopalon namuliensis 
Crepidorhopalon parviflorus 
Crepidorhopalon perennis 
Crepidorhopalon robynsii 
Crepidorhopalon rupestris 
Crepidorhopalon scaettae 
Crepidorhopalon schweinfurthii 
Crepidorhopalon spicatus 
Crepidorhopalon symoensii 
Crepidorhopalon tenuifolius 
Crepidorhopalon tenuis 
Crepidorhopalon uvens 
Crepidorhopalon welwitschii 
Crepidorhopalon whytei

References

Linderniaceae
Lamiales genera